Miquel Capllonch Rotger (14 January 1861 in Pollença - 21 December 1935) was a Majorcan pianist and composer.

He studied music in Pollença with his cousin, Joan Rotger, organist of the parish of Pollença.

He continued his musical studies with William Massot and at the Conservatory of Music in Madrid, with teachers like Tragó, Galiana, Chapí and Hernando.

He then worked in Madrid with the Polish composer Weber. He obtained a grant from the Island's Council to complete studies in Germany, where he was a student at the Conservatory of Music in Berlin. Among his teachers there was Anton Rubinstein who would become a good friend. He taught music for the royal families of Prussia (the Hohenzollerns ) and Saxony, and gave concerts for European royalty.

In 1906 he married Gabriela Miteau with whom he had four children. In 1912 he moved with his family to Madrid, and three years later to Barcelona.

Works

References
 http://www.culturapollensa.com/es/tema/miquel-capllonch/
 http://www.march.es/Musica/contemporanea/archivo/fichaCompositor.asp?Id_Compositor=12

External links
 http://www.geocities.com/Vienna/Choir/1838/pagconciyasrealizados3.htm
 http://www.fundacionrotgervillalonga.org/index.php?option=com_content&task=view&id=23&Itemid=45

1861 births
1935 deaths
People from Mallorca
Spanish composers
Spanish male composers
Spanish pianists
Musicians from the Balearic Islands